Travis LaVell Hill (October 3, 1969 – March 28, 2018) was an American professional football player who played two seasons in the National Football League (NFL) with the Cleveland Browns and Carolina Panthers. Drafted in the 7th round by the Cleveland Browns in 1993, Hill did not see any playing time during the 1993 season, instead making his debut with the Browns in 1994. The following season, he played four games with the Browns before being traded to the expansion Panthers, where he would play the final three games of his career. During his brief career, Hill played in 21 games, recorded two tackles (one solo and one assist) and scored one touchdown, which came after a blocked punt. He died on March 28, 2018.

References

External links
 NFL profile

1969 births
2018 deaths
American football linebackers
Carolina Panthers players
Cleveland Browns players
Nebraska Cornhuskers football players
Players of American football from Texas
African-American players of American football
20th-century African-American sportspeople
21st-century African-American people
Pearland High School alumni